D0260, named Lion, was a prototype Type 4 mainline diesel-electric locomotive built in 1962 by a consortium of Birmingham Railway Carriage and Wagon Company, Sulzer the engine maker and Associated Electrical Industries, at BRCW's Smethwick works near Birmingham.

The locomotive's number was derived from its works number, DEL260.

Specification
Lion was a private venture to meet a requirement from British Railways for a powerful locomotive of Co-Co wheel arrangement, as a substitute for the earlier 1Co-Co1 locomotives such as the Peak classes. The specifications were revealed by the British Transport Commission (BTC) at a meeting on 15 January 1960. Train heating was to be by both steam and electric train heating (ETH). Unlike the earlier Pilot Scheme, the BTC expected that these prototypes would be funded by the makers, rather than bulk orders being placed sight-unseen. For the Type 4, that gave rise to three prototypes: Falcon, DP2 and Lion, eventually leading to the Class 47 and Class 50.

Lion used a more powerful development of the same engine as the Class 44 Peaks, but lighter overall and with a more reliable bogie design. It was a development of the  12LDA28A used for the Peaks. At that time, the Sulzer engines were favoured over English Electric's V12 option, despite their greater cost of £45,000 vs. £26,000, and their weight of 22.3 tons vs 19.4 tons.

The design dimensions of both Lion and the Class 47 were the same, although the Class 47 ended up a few tons overweight.

Construction

Body 
Lion's overall construction was as a truss from bufferbeam to bufferbeam, using the full height of the body to cant rail level as the structure. It was built from welded thin steel sheet, as either sheet or pressings. This gave a structure which was stiff and strong, yet avoided the weight of heavy underfloor girder sections. Truss structures had been used previously for the Peaks, although with the channel underframe as well, but these had been the diagonally-braced Pratt truss, which limited access through the sides and made access for maintenance difficult, often requiring an overhead crane. Lion used the uncommon Vierendeel truss, which is characterised by its rectangular openings. Although an inefficient structure for bridges, owing to the restricted bracing, the openings allowed better access through the body sides and Lion had central access doors for servicing. The driver's doors were also openings in the truss, which could extend to the full length of the bodyshell and cabs. 

Engine cooling was performed entirely in the roof section above the cant rail, explaining the lack of large cooling grilles in the body sides. The cooling group was provided by Serck and used two radiators in a removable pack in the roof over the Nº1 end and the Spanner Swirlyflow steam heating boiler. Air was drawn in from the sides, through the panels, and exhausted upwards in the centre by two electric fans. The main roof section, above the engine, was unusual in that it was a translucent fibreglass moulding, which provided light into the engine room, despite the body's small windows. This lightweight moulding could be raised upwards by pneumatic cylinders when stationary, to act as an air vent before needing access to the engine. The roof could then be slid lengthways, allowing fairly major engine servicing such as piston replacement, without needing a large overhead crane to remove a metal roof. The oil-wetted engine air filters were also mounted in the roof section, leaving more space in the body.

The external styling, particularly the cab design and its fibreglass roof panels, resembled the Class 35 Hymeks, as they shared the same designer. The outer cladding skin was a load-bearing steel sheet. As such skins otherwise tended to show uneven ripples, Lion had this stiffened by five lengthwise fluted ribs. The livery stood out from other locomotives, although also showed dirt, as it was painted white overall with the side ribs picked out in gold.

Testing
BR tested it initially on Western Region services out of London Paddington based at Wolverhampton Stafford Road Shed. Later it moved to Finsbury Park on the Eastern Region for services London King's Cross. However, BR decided to purchase its new Type 4 fleet from Brush Traction (the Class 47) and so D0260 was withdrawn in February 1964.

Disposal

Full details of Lion's final withdrawal have never been fully made public, and even the BRC&W workforce were not informed of its fate. But at some time after withdrawal, Lion was moved to AEI's works at Attercliffe where AEI became responsible for stripping the locomotive, primarily to recover their electrical components. During this process Sulzer recovered their 12LDA28C power unit and radiators (the engine was sent to be reconditioned at Vickers in Barrow-in-Furness, and was subsequently installed into an unknown production Class 47). What remained, principally the body shell and bogies, were scrapped at the Attercliffe yard of scrap merchant Thos. W. Ward. The date on which Ward finally cut up the remains is unclear. One report puts it as late as 1965.

Models 

D0260 Lion available as a kit and ready-to-run in 00 gauge by Silver Fox Models.

There is now a limited edition, of 4,000, 00 gauge model of Lion in its white livery produced by Heljan.

References

Sources

Further reading

External links

  Rail Photo Archive - D0260
Class 47 web site section on D0260 Lion
Publicity Shot of Lion

D0260
BRCW locomotives
Co-Co locomotives
Railway locomotives introduced in 1962
Standard gauge locomotives of Great Britain
Diesel-electric locomotives of Great Britain
Scrapped locomotives